Wilbur David "Lefty" Good (September 28, 1885 – December 30, 1963) born in Punxsutawney, Pennsylvania, was an outfielder for the New York Highlanders (1905), Cleveland Naps (1908–09), Boston Doves/Rustlers (1910–11), Chicago Cubs (1911–15), Philadelphia Phillies (1916) and Chicago White Sox (1918).

In 11 seasons he played in 749 games and had 2,364 at-bats, 324 runs, 609 hits, 84 doubles, 44 triples, 9 home runs, 187 RBI, 104 stolen bases, 190 walks, a .258 batting average, a .322 on-base percentage, a .342 slugging percentage, 808 total bases and 60 sacrifice hits.

He died in Brooksville, Florida at the age of 78.

References

External links

1885 births
1963 deaths
People from Punxsutawney, Pennsylvania
Baseball players from Pennsylvania
New York Highlanders players
Cleveland Naps players
Boston Doves players
Boston Rustlers players
Chicago Cubs players
Philadelphia Phillies players
Chicago White Sox players
Major League Baseball center fielders
Major League Baseball right fielders
Atlanta Crackers managers
Minor league baseball managers
Johnstown Johnnies players
Akron Champs players
Lancaster Red Roses players
Baltimore Orioles (IL) players
Kansas City Blues (baseball) players
Atlanta Crackers players
San Antonio Bears players
Macon Peaches players
Kansas City Blues (baseball) managers